Free Tempo is the third studio album by Puerto Rican rapper Tempo. It was released during his incarceration by Sony Music Latin on May 19, 2009. The album received a nomination for Best Long Form Music Video at the 10th Annual Latin Grammy Awards for the video which featured the London Symphony Orchestra.

Track listing

References

2009 albums
Tempo (rapper) albums